The Huangmanzhai waterfalls are five waterfalls in Jiexi County, Jieyang, Guangdong, China. The main waterfall (Feihong waterfall) is 56 meters high and 82 meters wide.

References 

Waterfalls of China
Landforms of Guangdong